Petleshkovo is a village in General Toshevo Municipality, Dobrich Province, in northeastern Bulgaria.

Petleshkov Hill in Antarctica is named after the village.

References

Villages in Dobrich Province